Arthur Wells Gilmore, known as Art Gilmore (March 18, 1912 – September 25, 2010) was an American actor and announcer heard on radio and television programs, children's records, movies, trailers, radio commercials, and documentary films. He also appeared in several television series and a few feature films.

Biography
Reared in Tacoma, Washington, Gilmore attended Washington State University in 1931, where he was a member of the Chi chapter of Phi Mu Alpha Sinfonia music fraternity and a member of the Alpha Omicron chapter of Theta Chi fraternity. In 1935, he was hired to work as an announcer for Seattle's KOL Radio. In 1936, he became a staff announcer for the Warner Brothers' radio station KFWB in Hollywood and then moved to the CBS-owned station KNX as a news reader. During World War II, he served as a fighter-director U.S. Navy officer aboard an aircraft carrier in the Pacific Ocean.

Leaving the Navy, he decided to become a professional singer and returned to Hollywood. With a group of notable Hollywood radio stars, including Edgar Bergen, Ralph Edwards and Jim Jordan, Gilmore founded Pacific Pioneer Broadcasters in 1966. At the time of his death, he was Chairman Emeritus of PPB. The organization presents the Art Gilmore Career Achievement Award four times each year to celebrities who have made notable contributions to the broadcasting and related industries. The organization was renamed Hollywood Media Professionals in 2019.

Radio
Gilmore's announcing voice became a part of many radio programs. Drawing his inspiration from the radio sports commentators of the 1930s, he became the announcer for Amos 'n' Andy, The Adventures of Frank Race, Dr. Christian, Sears Radio Theater, Stars over Hollywood, The Golden Days of Radio and other radio shows. It was Gilmore who introduced Herbert W. Armstrong and Garner Ted Armstrong, reminding listeners to request free religious literature at the conclusion of The World Tomorrow on radio and television.

Television
With the advent of television, Gilmore heralded The George Gobel Show, The Red Skelton Show, An Evening with Fred Astaire and many others.  He narrated 156 episodes of Highway Patrol with Broderick Crawford, 39 segments of Mackenzie's Raiders with Richard Carlson 41 episodes of Men of Annapolis and all 36 episodes of The New Breed. His television appearances included The Mary Tyler Moore Show, Adam-12, Emergency!, Dragnet and The Waltons. He announced Ronald Reagan's "A Time for Choosing" speech in 1964 supporting Barry Goldwater for U.S. President.

Films
Gilmore was heard in films as the voice of President Franklin Delano Roosevelt in the 1942 production of Yankee Doodle Dandy, and in The Gallant Hours (1960), where he was the narrator for Japanese sequences. His dramatic voice was also heard on countless film trailers beginning in the 1940s (he narrated the trailer for the 1946 film Gilda), and on documentary films throughout the 1950s and 1960s. (He appeared on camera at the beginning of the trailer for the 1948 thriller The Big Clock.) He narrated the Joe McDoakes series of short comedies which starred George O'Hanlon, notably So You Want to Be a Detective (1948), in which he participated (with the camera as his point of view). Gilmore also served as the president of American Federation of Television and Radio Artists (AFTRA) from 1961 until 1963.

Recordings
In addition to his radio-TV work, he provided the narration for many collections of recorded musical works and a large number of recordings for children. Gilmore was also active in reading textbooks for the blind and dyslexic for many years.

Books
Gilmore co-authored the book Television and Radio Announcing''.

Death
He died of natural causes on September 25, 2010, aged 98. Gilmore was survived by his wife, Grace; daughters Marilyn and Barbara; two grandchildren; and four great-grandchildren. His nephew, Robb Weller, said that his uncle was the reason he chose to work in broadcasting.

Filmography

References

External links

 

1912 births
2010 deaths
United States Navy personnel of World War II
United States Navy officers
American male radio actors
American male voice actors
Radio and television announcers
California Republicans
Male actors from Tacoma, Washington
Presidents of the American Federation of Television and Radio Artists